Zhao Zhenjiang (born February 1940) is a Chinese translator. For his contributions to the introduction of Spanish literature to foreign readers, he was honored with Queen Isabel Medal by the Spanish government in 1998, Order of May by Argentina in 1999, and Neruda Centennial Medal by Chile in 2004.

Biography
Zhao was born in Shunyi County, Beijing, in February 1940. He secondary studied at Niulanshan High School. After graduating in 1963, he taught at the university.

Personal life
Zhao married , who is also a Spanish literature translator.

Works

Translations

Honours and awards
 1995 Order of Reuven Dario
 1998 Queen Isabel Medal for translating Dream of Red Mansion
 1999 Order of May for translating Martin Fierro
 2004 Neruda Centennial Medal

References

1940 births
Living people
People from Beijing
Peking University alumni
Academic staff of Peking University
Spanish–Chinese translators